Samkelo is a masculine given name. Notable people with the name include:

Samkelo Mvimbi (born 1999), South African field hockey player
Samkelo Radebe (born 1989), South African Paralympic sprint runner and high jumper

Masculine given names